Earl Hudson (born December 17, 1957) is an American musician, best known as the drummer for Bad Brains. Born in Alabama in 1957, Hudson is the younger brother of the band's lead singer H.R. Although he has rarely recorded or performed outside of the band, he and bandmates, guitarist Dr. Know and bassist Darryl Jenifer, were recruited by rapper Lil' Jon, a longtime fan of the band, to record the song "Real Nigga Roll Call", which interpolated the music of I Against Is "Re-Ignition". He has also appeared on albums by H.R. as well as in H.R.'s live band in 1980s and 1990s.

References

1957 births
American musicians of Jamaican descent
African-American drummers
African-American rock musicians
American punk rock drummers
American male drummers
American Rastafarians
Converts to the Rastafari movement
Bad Brains members
Living people
20th-century American drummers